Saltha is an upazila of Faridpur District in the Division of Dhaka, Bangladesh. Bounded by Faridpur Sadar Upazila on the north, Muksudpur and Kashiani Upazilas on the south, Nagarkanda Upazila on the east and Boalmari Upazila on the west, Saltha Upazila has an area 182.96' km2, located in between 23°18' and 23°30' north latitudes and in between 89°43' and 89°53' east longitudes.

Administration
Saltha Upazila is divided into eight union parishads: Atghar, Ballabhdi, Bhawal, Gatti, Jadunandi, Mazadia, Ramkantapur, and Sonapur. The union parishads are subdivided into 115 mauzas and 159 villages.

See also
Upazilas of Bangladesh
Districts of Bangladesh
Divisions of Bangladesh

References

Upazilas of Faridpur District